Bábism is a monotheistic religion that was founded in 1844 in Qajar Persia by ʻAli Muhammad Shirazi (1819–1850), who took the title of the Báb (meaning "gate").

The following outline is provided as an overview of and topical guide to Bábism.

History

Background 
 Shaykhism – a Shi'a Islamic religious movement out of which Bábism emerged
 Shaykh Ahmad – the founder of Shaykhism
 Kazim Rashti – the leader of Shaykhism after the death of Shaykh Ahmad

Events 
 Conference of Badasht – a meeting of leading followers of the Báb in 1848
 Battle of Fort Tabarsi – a seven-month battle between the Báb's followers and the Shah's army from 1848 to 1849
 Execution of the Báb – the execution of the Báb on July 9, 1850

Baháʼí/Bábí connection 
Baháʼí–Azali split – the division of the Báb's followers into Baháʼís (who followed Baháʼu'lláh) and Azalis (who followed Subh-i-Azal)
 Baháʼí Faith – a religion founded by Baháʼu'lláh, who claimed to have fulfilled the Báb's prophecies of Him whom God shall make manifest, and which today has 5–8 million followers
 Azalis – the Bábís who followed Subh-i-Azal

Chroniclers 
 Edward Granville Browne – a British Iranologist (1862–1926) who wrote extensively about Bábí history
 Nabíl-i-Aʻzam – a Bábí and then Baháʼí who wrote a chronicle of Bábí and Baháʼí history from a Baháʼí perspective, known as The Dawn-Breakers

People 
 Báb – the founder of Bábism
 Letters of the Living – the title given by the Báb to a group of his followers
 Mulla Husayn – the first follower of the Báb when he made his religious claims in 1844
 Mullá 'Alíy-i-Bastámí – a prominent follower of the Báb
 Táhirih – an influential Bábí poet and theologian, who was born as Fátimih Baraghání and later became known as Táhirih ("the pure one")
 Quddús – a prominent follower of the Báb
 Khadíjih-Bagum – the wife of the Báb
 Subh-i-Azal – the appointed successor of the Báb, who went on to lead the Azali Bábís
 Baháʼu'lláh – a prominent follower of the Báb who later founded the Baháʼí Faith, claiming to fulfill the Báb's prophecies of He whom God shall make manifest
 Dayyán – a prominent follower of the Báb

Teachings 
Teachings of the Báb

Texts written by the Báb 

 Bayán – a term used both for the entire corpus of the Báb's writings and for two specific texts
 Arabic Bayán
 Persian Bayán
 Qayyūm al-asmā
 Kitabu'l-Asmáʼ
 Selections from the Writings of the Báb – a compilation of excerpts from the Báb's writings published by the Universal House of Justice, the world governing body of the Baháʼí Faith

Places 
 Báb's house – the place where the Báb first made his religious claims, which was demolished in 1979
 Shrine of the Báb – the site of the Báb's remains, administered by the leadership of the Baháʼí Faith

See also 
 Outline of the Baháʼí Faith
 Outline of religion

References

External links 

 
Bábism
Bábism